Iby may refers to:
Qakare Ibi (reigned c. 2170 BCE), ancient Egyptian pharaoh
Ibi (Egyptian Noble) (fl. 7th century BCE)
Friedl Iby (1905 – 1960), German gymnast
Paul Iby (born 1935), Austrian bishop

See also
Ibi (disambiguation)